The order of precedence of the Republic of India is a list in which the functionaries, dignitaries and officials are listed for ceremonial purposes and has no legal standing and does not reflect the Indian presidential line of succession or the co-equal status of the separation of powers under The Constitution of India. The order is established by the President of India, through the President's Secretariat and is maintained by the Ministry of Home Affairs. It is not applicable for the day-to-day functioning of the Government of India.

Order 
If there are multiple persons of similar rank, then they will be listed in alphabetical order. The order of precedence between themselves is determined by the date of entry into that position/rank.

Notes

See also 
 Gazetted Officer
 List of office-holders in India

References

External links 
 Order of Precedence of India MHA, India

Order of precedence
Orders of precedence